Bob Ferguson may refer to:

Bob Ferguson (American football) (1939–2004), American football fullback
Bob Ferguson (footballer) (1917–2006), English professional footballer
Bob Ferguson (golfer) (1846–1915), golfer
Bob Ferguson (infielder) (1845–1894), baseball infielder, manager, executive, and umpire
Bob Ferguson (journalist) (1931–2014), Canadian sports journalist and writer
Bob Ferguson (musician) (1927–2001), songwriter, manager, executive, writer, historian, and media specialist
Bob Ferguson (pitcher) (1919–2008), baseball pitcher
Bob Ferguson (politician) (born 1965), Washington state politician
Bob Ferguson (ice hockey) (born 1954), Canadian former ice hockey player and coach
Bob Ferguson (pole vaulter), Canadian pole vaulter and medallist in athletics at the 1986 Commonwealth Games

See also
Robert Ferguson (disambiguation)
Bobby Ferguson (disambiguation)
Ferguson (name)